The  is a diesel multiple unit (DMU) train type introduced by Japanese National Railways (JNR) in 1977 and operated by all Japan Railways Group companies on suburban and rural services in Japan. Since 2017, the train type has seen use by other private railway companies in Japan, following the removal of services by Japan Railways groups. Additionally, it has also seen use in overseas operations in Myanmar since 2011.

Overview
The KiHa 40 series diesel multiple unit was introduced in 1977 by JNR to replace ageing KiHa 10 series DMUs on suburban and rural services nationwide. A total of 888 vehicles were built between 1977 and 1982, broadly divided into three main types: KiHa 40, KiHa 47, and KiHa 48. These were subdivided as shown below, with further variants and modifications made later in their lives by the various JR Group companies.

"Cold" regions refers to the Tohoku and Chubu regions.

JR Hokkaido
Following the privatization and splitting of JNR in April 1987, JR Hokkaido received a total of 157 KiHa 40 series vehicles (150 KiHa 40s and 7 KiHa 48s). , JR Hokkaido operates 153 KiHa 40 series vehicles, classified as follows.
 KiHa 40-300
 KiHa 40-330
 KiHa 40-350
 KiHa 40-400
 KiHa 40-700
 KiHa 40-1700
 KiHa 48-1300
 KiHa 400-100
 KiHa 480-300
 KiHa 480-1300

JR East
Following the privatization and splitting of JNR in April 1987, JR East received a total of 219 KiHa 40 series vehicles (117 KiHa 40s, 28 KiHa 47s, and 74 KiHa 48s). As of 1 April 2010, JR East operates 159 KiHa 40 series vehicles, classified as follows. KiHa 48 502 and KiHa 48 1512 were derailed and badly damaged by the 2011 Tōhoku earthquake and tsunami on 11 March 2011, and were withdrawn.
 KiHa 40-500
 KiHa 40-1000
 KiHa 40-2000
 KiHa 47-0
 KiHa 47-500
 KiHa 47-1000
 KiHa 47-1500
 KiHa 48-500
 KiHa 48-1500

Joyful Train sets
 Furusato (KiHa 48-2500)
 Kirakira Michinoku (KiHa 48)
 Resort Minori (KiHa 48-500)
 Resort Shirakami "Aoike" (KiHa 48)
 Resort Shirakami "Buna" (KiHa 48)
 Resort Shirakami "Kumagera" (KiHa 48)
 Umineko (KiHa 48)
 View Coaster Kazekko (KiHa 48)
 Koshino Shu*Kura (KiHa 40 and 48)

JR Central
Following the privatization and splitting of JNR in April 1987, JR Central received a total of 59 KiHa 40 series vehicles (14 KiHa 40s, 5 KiHa 47s, and 40 KiHa 48s). By April 2010, JR Central operated 59 KiHa 40 series vehicles, classified as follows. These were withdrawn by 2016.
 KiHa 40-3000
 KiHa 40-3300
 KiHa 40-5000
 KiHa 40-5500
 KiHa 40-5800
 KiHa 40-6000
 KiHa 40-6300
 KiHa 47-5000
 KiHa 47-6000
 KiHa 48-3500
 KiHa 48-3800
 KiHa 48-5000
 KiHa 48-5300
 KiHa 48-5500
 KiHa 48-5800
 KiHa 48-6000
 KiHa 48-6300
 KiHa 48-6500
 KiHa 48-6800

JR-West
Following the privatization and splitting of JNR in April 1987, JR-West received a total of 257 KiHa 40 series vehicles (63 KiHa 40s, 189 KiHa 47s, and 5 KiHa 48s). , JR-West operates 255 KiHa 40 series vehicles, classified as follows.
 KiHa 40-3000
 KiHa 41-2000
 KiHa 47-2000
 KiHa 47-2500
 KiHa 48-3000
 KiHa 48-3500

Joyful Train sets
 Misuzu Shiosai (KiHa 47)
 Setonai Marine View (KiHa 47)
 Belles Montagnes et Mer (KiHa 40)
 Hanayome Noren (KiHa 48)
 Tenkū no shiro Takeda-jō ato (KiHa 40)

JR Shikoku
Following the privatization and splitting of JNR in April 1987, JR Shikoku received a total of 53 KiHa 40 series vehicles (11 KiHa 40s and 42 KiHa 47s). , JR Shikoku operates 43 KiHa 40 series vehicles, classified as follows.
 KiHa 40-2000
 KiHa 47-0
 KiHa 47-500
 KiHa 47-1000
 KiHa 47-1500

Joyful Train sets
 Iyonada Monogatari (KiHa 47)

JR Kyushu
Following the privatization and splitting of JNR in April 1987, JR Kyushu received a total of 142 KiHa 40 series vehicles (36 KiHa 40s and 106 KiHa 47s). As of 1 April 2010, JR Kyushu operates 140 KiHa 40 series vehicles, classified as follows.
 KiHa 40-7000
 KiHa 40-8000
 KiHa 47-3500
 KiHa 47-4500
 KiHa 47-5000
 KiHa 47-6000
 KiHa 47-8000
 KiHa 47-8500
 KiHa 47-9000
 KiHa 47-9500
 KiHa 140-2000
 KiHa 147-0
 KiHa 147-1000

Joyful Train sets
 Hayato no Kaze (KiHa 47/147)
 Ibusuki no Tamatebako (KiHa 47/140)
 Aru Ressha (KiRoShi 47)
 Two Stars 4047 (KiHa 47/147)

Resale

Nishikigawa Railway
In 2017, 1 KiHa 40-1009 diesel carriage was taken over by Nishikigawa Railway, that ended operation on the Karasuyama Line by JR East in March 2017, the former diesel train is remodeled in retro style, and started operation on September 16 of the same year.

Kominato Railway
2 KiHa 40 carriages (KiHa 40-2021 and KiHa 40-2026), which ended operation on the Tadami Line in March 2020, were transferred to Kominato Railway in May 2020 with the Tohoku livery.

Overseas operations

A large fleet of former KiHa 40 series cars from JR East, JR Hokkaido, JR Shikoku, and JR Central were shipped to Myanmar between 2011 and 2016. A total of 48 diesel cars (including KiHa 40, KiHa 47, & KiHa 48) have been shipped to Myanmar for overseas operations. The cars are used on the Yangon Circular Railway.

Preserved examples
 KiHa 40 519: Next to Onagawa Station, Onagawa, Miyagi. However, it was damaged by the 2011 Tōhoku earthquake and tsunami on 11 March 2011, and was withdrawn.
 KiHa 40 764: Next to Ikutora Station, Minamifurano, Hokkaido as a cutaway body. This DMU was modified to resemble a KiHa 12 unit and used in Yasuo Furuhata's 1999 film .

In popular culture
The KiHa 140 is featured as a non-driveable train in the Microsoft Train Simulator computer game.
In 2017 NHK World-Japan dedicated an episode of their weekly show Japan Railway Journal to the KiHa 40 series.

References

Further reading

External links

 JR Central KiHa 40/47/48 information 

40 series
Passenger rail transport in Myanmar
Japanese National Railways
Hokkaido Railway Company
East Japan Railway Company
Central Japan Railway Company
West Japan Railway Company
Shikoku Railway Company
Kyushu Railway Company
Train-related introductions in 1977
Niigata Transys rolling stock
Fuji rolling stock